Cosmopolis is a city in Grays Harbor County, Washington, United States. The population was 1,638 at the 2020 census.

Geography
Cosmopolis is located at  (46.955352, -123.773176).

Climate
This region experiences warm (but not hot) and dry summers, with no average monthly temperatures above 71.6 °F.  According to the Köppen Climate Classification system, Cosmopolis has a warm-summer Mediterranean climate, abbreviated "Csb" on climate maps.

Demographics

2010 census
As of the census of 2010, there were 1,649 people, 677 households, and 463 families living in the city. The racial makeup of the city was 88.5% White, 0.1% African American, 1.6% Native American, 3.0% Asian, 0.3% Pacific Islander, 3.6% from other races, and 2.9% from two or more races. Hispanic or Latino of any race were 6.1% of the population.

There were 677 households, of which 31.9% had children under the age of 18 living with them, 52.4% were married couples living together, 9.7% had a female householder with no husband present, 6.2% had a male householder with no wife present, and 31.6% were non-families. 24.8% of all households were made up of individuals, and 10.2% had someone living alone who was 65 years of age or older. The average household size was 2.44 and the average family size was 2.87.

The median age in the city was 41.5 years. 22.6% of residents were under the age of 18; 7.5% were between the ages of 18 and 24; 24.9% were from 25 to 44; 28.9% were from 45 to 64; and 16.3% were 65 years of age or older. The gender makeup of the city was 48.9% male and 51.1% female.

2000 census
As of the census of 2000, there were 1,595 people, 645 households, and 454 families living in the city. The population density was 1,142.3 people per square mile (439.9/km2). There were 681 housing units at an average density of 487.7 per square mile (187.8/km2). The racial makeup of the city was 93.04% White, 0.13% African American, 1.76% Native American, 1.50% Asian, 0.06% Pacific Islander, 1.19% from other races, and 2.32% from two or more races. Hispanic or Latino of any race were 3.32% of the population. 17.3% were of German, 10.0% Irish, 9.6% American, 7.7% Polish, 6.1% English and 5.0% Italian ancestry.

There were 645 households, out of which 30.5% had children under the age of 18 living with them, 57.8% were married couples living together, 10.2% had a female householder with no husband present, and 29.6% were non-families. 25.0% of all households were made up of individuals, and 9.5% had someone living alone who was 65 years of age or older. The average household size was 2.47 and the average family size was 2.92.

In the city, the population was spread out, with 25.8% under the age of 18, 6.8% from 18 to 24, 27.1% from 25 to 44, 25.5% from 45 to 64, and 14.9% who were 65 years of age or older. The median age was 39 years. For every 100 females, there were 96.9 males. For every 100 females age 18 and over, there were 96.0 males.

The median income for a household in the city was $41,106, and the median income for a family was $51,000. Males had a median income of $41,411 versus $25,714 for females. The per capita income for the city was $18,759. About 7.4% of families and 11.3% of the population were below the poverty line, including 15.2% of those under age 18 and 9.2% of those age 65 or over.

Economy
In 2006, the Weyerhaueser pulp mill in Cosmopolis shut down, costing the local community 245 jobs. Previously, in late 2005, the Weyerhaueser large-log saw mill in Aberdeen closed, losing 95 jobs. In the late 2000s a biodiesel facility was being planned, but nothing has come of it, and it appears to be a dead idea.

In late 2010, the mill was purchased by the Gores Group and renamed Cosmo Specialty Fibers, which manufactures specialty pulps and exports much of the product to Asia via the deepwater port in Aberdeen.

Notable people
 Elton Bennett, artist

References

External links

 

Cities in Washington (state)
Cities in Grays Harbor County, Washington